The 2012–13 Macedonian Second Football League was the 21st season since its establishment. It began on 11 August 2012 and ended on 28 May 2013.

Participating teams

League table

Results 
Every team will play each other team twice (home and away) for a total of 30 matches each.

Promotion playoff

Relegation playoff

See also
2012–13 Macedonian Football Cup
2012–13 Macedonian First Football League
2012–13 Macedonian Third Football League

References

External links
Football Federation of Macedonia 
MacedonianFootball.com 

Macedonia 2
2012–13 in Republic of Macedonia football
Macedonian Second Football League seasons